Octo may refer to:

 The numeral prefix "octo-", from the Latin for the number eight
 Octo Telematics, a company that analyses driver behaviour for insurance companies etc.
 Octo (automobile), a French car of the 1920s
 Octo, a character in the Japanese manga series Monster Musume

See also
 Okto, a TV channel in Singapore